Johannes Fredericus Samuel Esser (13 October 1877 in Leiden – 9 August 1946 in Chicago) was a Dutch plastic surgeon who pioneered innovative methods of reconstructive surgery on soldiers wounded in the First World War.  He is thought to have coined the term "stent" in 1917 to describe his use of a dental impression compound invented in 1856 by the English dentist Charles Stent (1807–1885) to create a form for facial reconstruction.  The term "stent" was later extended to mean a device to expand constricted tubes of body tissue.

He was a one time Dutch Chess Champion, winning the Dutch Championship in a play-off match for the title against Rudolf Loman in 1913.

Further reading
The New York Times, August 10, 1946, p. 13 c. 2

External links
"The Story of Dr. Charles Stent" by Malvin E. Ring, DDS, MLS, FACD accessed 27 January 2015

1877 births
1946 deaths
Dutch Jews
Dutch plastic surgeons
Dutch chess players
Jewish chess players
People from Leiden